Guayaibi is a town in the San Pedro department of Paraguay. It includes such notable communities as Carayao-i and Dos Mil Fatima.

Sources 
World Gazeteer: Paraguay – World-Gazetteer.com

References

Populated places in the San Pedro Department, Paraguay